Henry XII may refer to:

 Henry the Lion XII, Duke of Bavaria (1129–1195)
 Henry XII, Count of Schwarzburg-Blankenburg (1336–1372)